Stephanie Ann Alexander  (born 13 November 1940) is an Australian cook, restaurateur and food writer.

After studying to become a librarian and travelling the world at the age of 21, Alexander's first restaurant, Jamaica House, opened in 1964. In 1976, her next venture was Stephanie's Restaurant, located in the Melbourne suburb of Fitzroy before moving to the middle-class suburb of Hawthorn in 1980. Stephanie's Restaurant closed in 1997 after operating for 21 years. She went on to publish several cookbooks, including her alphabetical guide to ingredients and cooking, The Cook's Companion.

Kitchen Garden Foundation 
In 2001 Stephanie piloted the Stephanie Alexander Kitchen Garden Program at Collingwood College in Melbourne. The program grew out of Alexander's belief that children learn about food early in life through example and positive experiences, which continues to influence their food choices through life. 

In February 2004 the Stephanie Alexander Kitchen Garden Foundation was established. This not-for-profit organisation is dedicated to supporting schools introducing pleasurable food education, teaching students to grow, harvest, prepare and share fresh, seasonal, delicious food. As of December 2018, the Foundation is now working with more than 1800 schools and early years centres teaching pleasurable food education, and this number is growing.

The Foundation engages with schools, governments, philanthropists and passionate individual donors to secure ongoing funding.

Honours
On 26 January 1969, Alexander was awarded the Medal of the Order of Australia in recognition of services to the hospitality and the tourist industry and to the encouragement of apprentices. On 1 January 2001, she was awarded the Centenary Medal for outstanding service to the food and wine industry in Victoria. On 26 January 2014, she was appointed an Officer of the Order of Australia for distinguished service to education through the design and establishment of schools-based learning programs promoting improved food and eating choices for children, and as an author.

Personal life
Alexander's parents were Winston, a former public servant who ran a caravan park on the Mornington Peninsula, and Mary née Burchett. She is the niece of the journalist Wilfred Burchett.

Alexander has married and divorced twice. Her first husband, Rupert Montague, known as Monty, was a Jamaican she met in London. In Melbourne they opened The Jamaica House restaurant three weeks after the birth of their daughter Lisa. Her second husband was Maurice Alexander, a barrister, with whom she had another daughter, Holly.

Bibliography
 Menu for Food Lovers (1985)
Stephanie's Feasts & Stories (1988)
Stephanie's Australia (1992)
 Stephanie's Seasons (1995)
 Recipes My Mother Gave Me (1997)
 Stephanie's Journal (1997)
 A Shared Table (2000)
 Cooking & Travelling in South-West France (2002)
 Stephanie's Menus for Food Lovers (revised 2003)
 Tuscan Cookbook (co-written with Maggie Beer, 2003)
 The Cook's Companion (first ed. 1996, revised 2004, revised 2014)
 Kitchen Garden Cooking with Kids (2006)
 The Kitchen Garden Companion (2009)
A Cook's Life (2012)
 The Cook's Table (2015)
Kitchen Garden Companion: Growing (2016)
Kitchen Garden Companion: Cooking (2017)
The Cook's Apprentice (2018)

References

External links
 Stephanie Alexander's website
 Stephanie Alexander Kitchen Garden National Program

Australian food writers
Australian non-fiction writers
Australian women writers
Australian chefs
Living people
Writers from Melbourne
Recipients of the Centenary Medal
Officers of the Order of Australia
1940 births
Place of birth missing (living people)
Women food writers
Women cookbook writers